Juan Marcos Foyth (born 12 January 1998) is an Argentine professional footballer who plays as right-back, centre-back or defensive-midfielder for La Liga club Villarreal and the Argentina national team.

Having begun his professional career at his hometown club Estudiantes, he went on to play in the Premier League for Tottenham Hotspur and in La Liga for Villarreal. He won the UEFA Europa League with the latter club in 2021.

Foyth made his senior international debut for Argentina in 2018 and was part of their squad that came third at the 2019 Copa América and won the 2022 Finalissima and 2022 FIFA World Cup.

Club career

Estudiantes
Born in La Plata, Buenos Aires Province, Foyth began his career at hometown club Estudiantes de La Plata. He played for a number of years in the Youth academy, initially as an attacking midfielder, then moved to centre-back before he turned 16. He signed his first professional contract in January 2017, which linked him to the club until June 2019. He made his Primera División debut on 19 March 2017, against Patronato, aged 19. He went on to play a further six times in the league, with additional two appearances in the Copa Sudamericana.

Tottenham Hotspur
Foyth joined Tottenham Hotspur for a reported £8 million on 30 August 2017, on a five-year contract. He made his debut on 19 September in an EFL Cup tie against Barnsley that Tottenham won 1–0. 

Foyth made his Premier League debut on 3 November 2018 in a 3–2 away win against Wolverhampton Wanderers, where he conceded two penalties which were both converted. In his next league appearance, away to Crystal Palace, he scored his first career goal, handing Tottenham a 1–0 win. On 4 May 2019, he came on at half time for Toby Alderweireld and was sent off three minutes later for a foul on Jack Simpson in a 1–0 loss at AFC Bournemouth.

Villarreal
In October 2020, Foyth signed a new deal with Tottenham until 2024, and was then loaned to Spanish club Villarreal. He made his debut on 22 October, scoring in a 5–3 home win over Turkey's Sivasspor in the group stage of the UEFA Europa League. He made 11 more appearances in the tournament as his team won it, including a start in the final victory over Manchester United.

At the end of his loan season, Foyth signed for Villarreal in June 2021 on a five-year deal for a fee of €15 million. On 16 August, he was sent off in a goalless draw at Granada CF in the opening game of the season. He became a key player at right back for manager Unai Emery, replacing veteran Mario Gaspar and covering for the injured Serge Aurier. On 12 May 2022, he scored his first La Liga goal, to restore the lead in a 5–1 win at Rayo Vallecano.

International career
Foyth played for the Argentina national under-20 team in 2017. He made 12 appearances in total for the national youth team: nine at the 2017 South American Youth Football Championship in Ecuador, and another three during the 2017 FIFA U-20 World Cup.

Foyth was called up for the first time to the senior Argentina national team by manager Lionel Scaloni for a number of friendly games to be played in October 2018. He made his debut on 16 November in a friendly against Mexico where he helped Argentina to a 2–0 win, being named man of the match and receiving wide praise for his performance in this match. 

He was included in the final 23-man squad for the 2019 Copa América, and made his first start in the competition in the match against Qatar. He started as a right-back in three further games, including the semi-final they lost to Brazil 2–0, and the third-place play-off match against Chile, which they won 2–1.

On 1 June 2022, Foyth remained as an unused substitute as Argentina won 3–0 against reigning European Champions Italy at Wembley Stadium in the 2022 Finalissima.

He was named in Argentina's final 26-man squad for the 2022 FIFA World Cup in Qatar by Scaloni. He replaced Nahuel Molina in the final moments as Argentina defeated Croatia 3–0 in the semi-final. He was an unused substitute as Argentina won the World Cup by defeating France 4–2 in a penalty shoot-out to win the final.

Personal life
Foyth, who was born in Argentina, is of Polish descent and holds a Polish passport. He also holds Spanish nationality.

His grandparents' surname was spelled Fojt, which was changed on arrival in Argentina.

Foyth married his longtime girlfriend Ariana Alonso in La Plata, Argentina, in July 2019.

Career statistics

Club

International

Honours
Tottenham Hotspur
UEFA Champions League runner-up: 2018–19

Villarreal
UEFA Europa League: 2020–21

Argentina
FIFA World Cup: 2022
CONMEBOL–UEFA Cup of Champions: 2022

References

External links

Profile at the Villarreal CF website

1998 births
Living people
Footballers from La Plata
Argentine footballers
Argentina international footballers
Argentina youth international footballers
Argentina under-20 international footballers
Association football defenders
Estudiantes de La Plata footballers
Tottenham Hotspur F.C. players
Villarreal CF players
Argentine Primera División players
Premier League players
La Liga players
Argentine expatriate footballers
Expatriate footballers in England
Expatriate footballers in Spain
Argentine expatriate sportspeople in England
Argentine expatriate sportspeople in Spain
2019 Copa América players
2022 FIFA World Cup players
FIFA World Cup-winning players
Argentine people of Polish descent
UEFA Europa League winning players
Citizens of Poland through descent
Naturalised citizens of Spain